The Rivanna Subdivision Trestle is a trestle in Richmond, Virginia at the end of the Rivanna Subdivision.  The bridge is the upper level of Triple Crossing, and also crosses United States Routes 360.  It parallels the James River, and actually "steps" into it at one section.  The bridge connects to the Peninsula Subdivision Trestle.

CSX Transportation bridges
Railroad bridges in Virginia
Bridges in Richmond, Virginia
Trestle bridges in the United States